Pouldreuzic is a commune in the Finistère department, Brittany, northwestern France.

The writer Pêr-Jakez Helias was born and lived here; the "Maison de Pierre-Jakez Hélias" is now a museum: an early 20th-century house illustrating the writer's daily life.

There are historic churches of St Faron and Lababan and the chapel of Our Lady of Penhors. Also in the commune is the Musée de l'Amiral.

Population
Inhabitants of Pouldreuzic are called in French Pouldreuzicois.

See also
Communes of the Finistère department

References

External links

Mayors of Finistère Association 

Communes of Finistère
Finistère communes articles needing translation from French Wikipedia